Lisun Institute is a college institution in Liloy, Zamboanga del Norte,  Philippines.

It was founded in 1966 and presently managed and headed by Mrs. Philma S. Fuentes. This is considered the oldest school in the town.

Universities and colleges in Zamboanga del Norte